Courtney Dauwalter (born February 13, 1985) is an American ultramarathon runner.

Early life
Dauwalter was raised in Hopkins, Minnesota and competed in track, cross-country, and Nordic skiing in high school. She was a four-time Minnesota state champion in Nordic skiing during her high school career. She attended the University of Denver on a cross-country skiing scholarship, and then earned a master's degree in teaching from the University of Mississippi in 2010 while participating in the Mississippi Teacher Corps.

Dauwalter worked as a middle and high-school teacher in the Denver area before becoming a full-time professional runner in 2017.

Ultrarunning 
In 2016, Dauwalter set a course record at the Javelina Jundred 100K and won the Run Rabbit Run 100-mile race, finishing 75 minutes ahead of second place. She also won the 2017 Run Rabbit Run while battling temporary blindness when running the final 12 miles.

Dauwalter won the 2017 edition of the Moab 240 race in 2 days, 9 hours, and 59 minutes, finishing first overall and beating the second-place finisher by more than 10 hours.

In 2018, Dauwalter won the Western States Endurance Run, a 100-mile race, with a finishing time of 17h27m. Dauwalter competed in the Big's Backyard Ultra in 2018, finishing second overall and completing a total of 67 laps, setting the women's course record at 279.268 miles. She also placed second in the Tahoe 200, beating the previous women's course record by over 18 hours.

Dauwalter was named Ultra Runner of the Year in 2018 by Ultrarunning Magazine after winning 9 of the 12 races that she entered, including two where she finished first overall.

In 2019, Dauwalter won the Ultra-Trail du Mont-Blanc in a time of 24 h 34 min 26 sec, coming in 21st overall. She also competed in the 2019 edition of the Western states, but dropped after 77 miles. Dauwalter competed for the United States at the IAU 24 Hour World Championship in Brive-la-Gaillarde, France in October 2019, finishing 12th.

In 2020, Dauwalter won the American section of Big Dog's Ultra. She ran 68 laps for 283.3 miles for a finish time of 56 hours, 52 minutes, and 29 seconds. She set the record for the longest distance recorded by a female runner in the race.

Dauwalter is sponsored by Salomon. She is known for wearing looser shirts and baggy basketball-style shorts while running, which is uncommon among elite ultramarathoners.

In 2020, Dauwalter received the George Mallory Award  for pushing the boundaries of physical human achievement.

Selected race results

References 

Living people
American female ultramarathon runners
1985 births
21st-century American women